Giovanni Calabrese (born 30 October 1966 in Messina) is an Italian rower who competed at three Olympic Games.

He is married with Paola Grizzetti 6th in rowing at Los Angeles 1984 and his daughter Valentina is also a rower, silver medal at senior level at the 2010 European Rowing Championships, he is her coach.

Biography
Calabrese was twice world rowing champion; in 1987, he won in the lightweight double scull in Copenhagen, and ten years later in 1997, he won with the quad scull in Aiguebelette. He won a bronze medal in the double sculls event at the 2000 Summer Olympics, together with teammate Nicola Sartori.

References

External links
 

1966 births
Living people
Italian male rowers
Sportspeople from Messina
Rowers at the 1988 Summer Olympics
Rowers at the 1996 Summer Olympics
Rowers at the 2000 Summer Olympics
Olympic rowers of Italy
Olympic bronze medalists for Italy
Olympic medalists in rowing
Medalists at the 2000 Summer Olympics
World Rowing Championships medalists for Italy
20th-century Italian people
21st-century Italian people